Bromley Peak is a peak,  high, marking the summit of Horowitz Ridge in the Asgard Range, Victoria Land. It was named by the New Zealand Geographic Board (1998) after A. M. (Tony) Bromley, a New Zealand Polar Medalist involved in Antarctic meteorological research for 30 years, and a member of the 1974 Vanda Station winter party.

References 

Mountains of the Asgard Range
Scott Coast